Chike Ezekpeazu Osebuka (born January 28, 1993), popularly known by his stage name Chike is a Nigerian singer, songwriter and actor. He is known for participating in the Nigerian reality competition Project Fame West Africa and finishing in second place on Season 1 of The Voice Nigeria. Chike made his acting debut as mayoma badmus on the Africa Magic Showcase telenovela Battleground.

Early life and education 
Chike is a native of Onitsha, Anambra State in Nigeria and is one of four children. Chike decision to pursue a career in music was influenced by his family. He is a graduate of Covenant University with a degree in Computer Engineering.

Career

Project Fame
Chike was featured as a contestant on Project Fame West Africa however, was then eliminated after reaching the Top 10.

The Voice Nigeria
Chike auditioned for The Voice Nigeria with a cover of James Arthur's "Roses" and he opted to join Team Patoranking.

In the battle round, he performed Mario's "Let Me Love You" with another Team Patoranking contestant and was chosen to move to the next round. In the first week of live shows, he performed "Not the Girl" by co-coach Dare Art Alade and earned a 'save' from his coach. In the second week of live shows, he performed The Weeknd's "Earned It" and was saved by public votes. He also performed a rendition of "I'm Gonna Be (500 Miles)" by The Proclaimers and earned his coach's final save of the season. For the semi-finals, he performed "Pullover" by Kcee and Wizkid. In the finale, Chike performed covers of Bob Marley and the Wailers's "No Woman No Cry" and Kiss Daniel's "Mama". He finished as the runner-up of The Voice Nigeria' season, with A'rese from Team Waje coming in first place.

After The Voice Nigeria

2016

After The Voice Nigeria, Chike was signed to Universal Republic along with the other top four contestants on the show. He released his debut single Fancy U in December 2016 under Universal Republic, with its music video being released in early 2017. Chike was also made an ambassador for Airtel Nigeria along with the other seven finalists of The Voice Nigeria.

2017-2019
In April 2017, Chike had been cast by Africa Magic to play the role of Mayowa Badmus in a television drama named Battleground. Chike departed from Universal Republic in November 2017 to become an independent artist. He released his next single, titled "Beautiful People," in February 2018.

2020

Chike released his 14-track album titled Boo of the Booless.' during his special guest performance on the 2020 Big Brother Lockdown TV show.

2022

In August chike sold his car for his recently released album and tell fans not to pay attention while the see him trecking.

 Discography 
 Album Boo of the BoolessThe Brother's Keeper''

Awards and nominations

References

External links
Chike page on DSTV The Voice Nigeria page

21st-century Nigerian male singers
Living people
The Voice (franchise) contestants
Covenant University alumni
1993 births
Nigerian male film actors
Participants in Nigerian reality television series
Nigerian male singers
Male actors from Anambra State